Tottenham Lock (No17) is a paired lock on the River Lee Navigation in the London Borough of Haringey, England and is located near Tottenham, London. Like other locks as far as Ponders End it is large enough to take barges of up to 130 tons. The primary lock has been upgraded to mechanical operation, but the secondary west lock is operated manually.

Tottenham Lock was originally nearer to Stonebridge, but was relocated to its current location when the cut was created, creating a junction just south of the lock.

Transport
The nearest London Underground station is Tottenham Hale at Ferry Lane. The towpath is open to pedestrians and cyclists which forms part of the Lea Valley Walk.

Recreation
Angling is allowed on the River Lee Navigation upstream of the lock. Information from the River Lea Anglers Club.

References

External links
 The Lee Navigation
 Tottenham Lock - a history

Locks of London
Locks of the Lee Navigation